Head Chef refers to Chef de cuisine.

The term also refers to:
 Head Chef (TV program)